Tyler Wilkerson (born July 25, 1988) is an American professional basketball player for the Al Sharjah of the UAE National Basketball League. He played college basketball at Marshall University.

Professional career
In 2010, he signed with Hapoel Gilboa Galil of Israel. In March 2011, he moved to Maccabi Haifa B.C. for the rest of the 2010–11 season. He later re-signed with Maccabi for the 2011–12 season.

Wilkerson joined the San Antonio Spurs for the 2012 NBA Summer League. On September 20, 2012, he signed with the Spurs. However, he was waived on October 11. In November 2012, he was acquired by the Austin Toros.

On August 29, 2013, Wilkerson's rights were acquired by the Delaware 87ers in the 2013 NBA Development League Expansion Draft. He later joined Jeonju KCC Egis of South Korea for the 2013–14 season.

In 2014, he signed with the Guizhou White Tigers of the NBL.

On January 24, 2015, he signed with Piratas de Quebradillas of the Baloncesto Superior Nacional (BSN).

In February 2016, Wilkerson joined the San Miguel Beermen (PBA) to play as an import for the 2016 Commissioner's Cup Conference that started the same month.

In June 2016, Wilkerson signed in China with the Shaanxi Wolves for the 2016 NBL season.

References

External links
 Israeli Super League Profile
 Profile at Eurobasket.com
 NBA D-League Profile

1988 births
Living people
African-American basketball players
American expatriate basketball people in China
American expatriate basketball people in Israel
American expatriate basketball people in the Philippines
American expatriate basketball people in South Korea
American expatriate basketball people in the United Arab Emirates
American men's basketball players
Austin Toros players
Basketball players from Lexington, Kentucky
Hapoel Gilboa Galil Elyon players
Jeonju KCC Egis players
Maccabi Haifa B.C. players
Marshall Thundering Herd men's basketball players
Philippine Basketball Association imports
Piratas de Quebradillas players
Power forwards (basketball)
San Miguel Beermen players
21st-century African-American sportspeople
20th-century African-American people